The first USS Menhaden (SP-847) was a United States Navy patrol vessel and tug in commission from 1917 to 1919.

Menhaden was built as a commercial tug of the same name in 1905 by C. W. Crockett at Pocomoke City, Maryland. In May 1917, the U.S. Navy chartered her from her owner, E. Benson Dennis of Cape Charles, Virginia, for use as a section patrol vessel during World War I. She was commissioned as USS Menhaden (SP-847) on 21 May 1917.

Assigned to the 5th Naval District and based at Norfolk, Virginia, Menhaden provided tug and towing services and conducted harbor patrols in Hampton Roads for the rest of World War I and into 1919. She also provided support to the 5th Naval Districts minesweepers.

Menhaden was returned to Dennis on 12 March 1919.

References

Department of the Navy Naval History and Heritage Command Online Library of Selected Images: U.S. Navy Ships: USS Menhaden (SP-847), 1917-1919
NavSource Online: Section Patrol Craft Photo Archive Menhaden (SP 847)

Patrol vessels of the United States Navy
World War I patrol vessels of the United States
Tugs of the United States Navy
World War I auxiliary ships of the United States
Ships built in Pocomoke City, Maryland
1905 ships